James Edward Quibell (11 November 1867 – 5 June 1935) was a British Egyptologist.

Life
Quibbell was born in Newport, Shropshire. He married the Scottish artist and archaeologist Annie Abernethie Pirie in 1900.

He was educated at Adams' Grammar School in Newport and Christ Church, Oxford. He became fascinated by the antiquities, and offered himself as a pupil to Professor Flinders Petrie, with whom he worked at Coptos in 1893, then at Nagada, Ballas, Thebes, El Kab, and Hierakonpolis in successive years, including the Ramesseum. He also assisted Cecil Firth in his excavations in Saqqara. Between 1899 and 1904, he also served as chief inspector of antiquities for the Delta and Middle Egypt (Howard Carter, who was chief inspector at Luxor was his opposite). Later, between 1904 and 1905, he was appointed as chief inspector at Saqqara. Between 1914 and 1923, he was a keeper in the Cairo Museum, and served as director of excavations at the Step Pyramid between 1931 and 1935.

After six months' study at the Humboldt University of Berlin he was appointed to the Catalogue Commission of the Egyptian Museum, and in 1899 as an inspector on the staff of the Antiquities Department, a colleague being Howard Carter.

He worked at Saqqara, in the Valley of the Kings (where he discovered the tomb of Yuya and Tjuyu in 1905), and at Hierakonpolis (ancient Nekhen), where amongst other discoveries his team found the Narmer Palette in 1898. In 1898 he was made an inspector of the Antiquities Service for the Delta and Middle Egyptian regions. He later served as director of the Egyptian Museum from 1914 to 1923 and secretary-general of the Antiquities Service until 1925 when he retired.

References

External links
 
 

1867 births
1935 deaths
People from Newport, Shropshire
English Egyptologists
Alumni of Christ Church, Oxford
People educated at Adams' Grammar School
19th-century archaeologists
20th-century archaeologists
Egyptian Museum
English male non-fiction writers
19th-century English male writers